Vladimír Vůjtek (born 17 February 1972) is a Czech former professional ice hockey right wing.  He was drafted by the Montreal Canadiens in the fourth round, 73rd overall, of the 1991 NHL Entry Draft.

Career
Vůjtek played two seasons for HC Vítkovice in the Czechoslovak Extraliga before coming to North America to play for the Western Hockey League's Tri-City Americans.  He made his NHL debut with Montreal in the 1991–92 season, appearing in two games before returning the Americans.  Vůjtek joined the Edmonton Oilers' organization before the 1992–93 season, and played 70 games with the Oilers over two seasons. During the 1994-95 NHL lockout, Vůjtek returned to Europe. He remained in the Extraliga and the SM-liiga of Finland until 1997, where he played for HC Vitkovice for two seasons and spent one season skating with Ässät.

Vůjtek returned to the NHL with the Tampa Bay Lightning in the 1997–98 season. He played thirty games with the Lightning before being diagnosed with having the Epstein-Barr virus, which took a toll on his energy and eventually had him miss the remainder of the season. After being unsigned by the Lightning, Vůjtek returned to the HC Vitkovice organization for another season.

On 19 July 1999, Vůjtek signed with the Atlanta Thrashers. During a preseason game against the New York Rangers, Vujtek was accidentally cut by the skate of forward Valeri Kamensky and was rushed to the hospital. He received over 100 stitches on his right cheek and underwent over two and a half hours of plastic surgery. After three regular season games with the Thrashers, Vůjtek would again return to the Czech Republic.

After two seasons with HC Sparta Praha of Extraliga and a successful season with HPK Hameenlinna, Vůjtek returned to the NHL for a third time. Vujtek was signed on 15 July 2002 by then-General Manager Craig Patrick of the Pittsburgh Penguins to a one-year, $600,000 contract. Although Vujtek showed promise during training camp as a scoring leader, it did not translate into regular season success. Vůjtek opened the 2002-03 NHL season on the second line working with linemates Alexei Kovalev and Ville Nieminen. After five games, where Vůjtek recorded one assist, Vůjtek requested his release.

In his NHL career Vůjtek appeared in 110 games scoring seven goals and adding 30 assists.

Vůjtek returned to Europe after his release from the Penguins, where he would play several seasons in the Czech Republic, Finland, Russia and Switzerland. Vůjtek initially retired after the 2005–06 season after his hometown team HC Vitkovice did not offer him a contract. HC Vitkovice at the time was coached by his father, Vladimír Vůjtek Sr.

Vůjtek skated his final season in the Extraliga with HC Oceláři Třinec, where he scored nine points in twenty-four games.

Retirement
Vůjtek retired after the 2006–07 season. He is now a player agent for Eurohockey Services, co-managing the agency with former Pittsburgh Penguins teammate Michal Sivek.

Personal
His father, Vladimír Vůjtek Sr., is a head coach with 27 years experience of head coaching experience with Slovak national ice hockey team and teams in the Extraliga and in Russia with both the Russian Superleague and the KHL

Career statistics

Regular season and playoffs

International

Awards
 WHL (West) First All-Star Team 91/92
 CHL Third All-Star Team 91/92
 World Championship All-Star Team 96/97
 World Championship Bronze Medal 96/97
 World Championship Most Goals 96/97
 World Championship Most Points 96/97
 Czech Extraliga Champion 99/00
 SM-liiga All-Star Team 01/02
 SM-liiga Bronze Medal 01/02
 SM-liiga Player of the Month 01/02

References

External links

1972 births
Living people
Adirondack Red Wings players
Ässät players
Atlanta Thrashers players
Cape Breton Oilers players
Czechoslovak ice hockey right wingers
Czech ice hockey right wingers
Edmonton Oilers players
Czech expatriate ice hockey players in Russia
HC Forward-Morges players
HC Khimik Voskresensk players
HC Oceláři Třinec players
HC Sparta Praha players
HC Vítkovice players
HPK players
Las Vegas Thunder players
Montreal Canadiens draft picks
Montreal Canadiens players
Severstal Cherepovets players
Sportspeople from Ostrava
Pittsburgh Penguins players
Tampa Bay Lightning players
Tri-City Americans players
ZSC Lions players
Czechoslovak expatriate sportspeople in the United States
Czechoslovak expatriate ice hockey people
Czech expatriate ice hockey players in the United States
Czech expatriate ice hockey players in Canada
Czech expatriate ice hockey players in Finland
Czech expatriate ice hockey players in Switzerland
Czechoslovak expatriate sportspeople in Canada